Ghinda is a town in the Northern Red Sea region of Eritrea. It is situated in the Ghinda Subregion, and lies between Asmara and Massawa.

Overview
Ghinda is a major fruit and vegetable growing area and a centre for Tigre Muslims and some Saho Muslims . It lies near the springs of Sabarguma. The citrus plantations were originally planted by Carlo Cavanna, an Italian from Centenaro who directed the construction of the Eritrean Railway, the first railway in Italian Eritrea.

Climate

See also
Railway stations in Eritrea

References

Ghina, Eritrea

Northern Red Sea Region
Populated places in Eritrea